A moisturizer, or emollient, is a cosmetic preparation used for protecting, moisturizing, and lubricating the skin. These functions are normally performed by sebum produced by healthy skin. The word "emollient" is derived from the Latin verb mollire, to soften.

Mechanism of action 

In the human body, water constantly evaporates from the deeper layers of the skin through an effect known as transepidermal water loss (TEWL). By regulating its water content, human skin naturally maintains a dry, easily shed surface as a barrier against pathogens, dirt, or damage, while protecting itself from drying out and becoming brittle and rigid. The ability to retain moisture depends on the lipid bilayer between the dead skin cells.

Moisturizers modify the rate of water loss, with active ingredients of moisturizers falling into one of two categories: occlusives and humectants.

Occlusives form a hydrophobic coating on the surface of the skin, keeping moisture from escaping. The more occlusive the formulation, the greater the effect. Ointments are more occlusive than aqueous creams, which are more occlusive than lotion. Water loss through the skin is normally about 4–8 g/(m²⋅h). A layer of petrolatum applied to normal skin can reduce that loss by 50–75% for several hours. Oils naturally produced by the human body moisturize through this same mechanism.

Humectants are hydrophilic and absorb water. They can absorb this water from the air and moisturize the skin when the humidity is greater than 70%, but more commonly they draw water from the dermis into the epidermis, making skin dryer. A study published in Skin Research and Technology in 2001 found no link between humectants and moisturizing effect. When used in practical applications, they are almost always combined with occlusives.

Moisturizers often contain water, which acts as a temporary hydration agent as well as a way for the absorption of some components and evaporation of the moisturizer. They also help smoothen the skin by plugging gaps between dead skin cells.

Kinds 
There are many different types of moisturizers. Petrolatum is one of the most effective moisturizers, although it can be unpopular due to its oily consistency. 

Other popular moisturizers are cetyl alcohol, cetearyl alcohol, cocoa butter, isopropyl myristate, isopropyl palmitate, lanolin, liquid paraffin, polyethylene glycols, shea butter, silicone oils, stearic acid, stearyl alcohol and castor oil, as well as other oils.

Moisturizers may also be available as lotions, creams, ointments, bath oils, or soap substitutes.

Mineral oils and waxes are insensitive to oxidation or rancidity. For this reason, they have essentially replaced vegetable oils in emollients and topical medication.

Moisturizer cosmetics may additionally contain antioxidants, ceramides, emulsifiers, fragrances, penetration enhancers, preservatives, and solvents. Some products are marketed as having anti-wrinkle and skin enhancement effects. Many plant and animal extracts have been claimed to impart skin benefits, with little scientific evidence.

Use 
Moisturizers are used for the treatment of certain skin diseases, such as psoriasis, ichthyosis vulgaris, xerosis, and pruritus in atopic dermatitis. More often, they are bases or vehicles for topical medication, such as in Whitfield's ointment. They are often combined with humectants, such as salicylic acid and urea.

Moisturizers are also widely used in sunscreens, antiperspirants, skin cleansers, shaving creams, aftershaves, and hair tonics.

Moisturizers are used in disposable napkins to prevent dry skin and napkin dermatitis.

A Cochrane review noted that moisturizers show some beneficial effects in eczema. The same review did not find evidence that one moisturizer is better than another.

Potential health risks

Over-moisturization 

Persistent moisturization to the skin from exposure to water may contribute to an allergic reaction or irritant contact dermatitis, and can result in penetration of foreign objects. 

Changes in the skin's normal ecological environment, in or on the skin, can also support the overgrowth of pathological organisms.

Allergens 

Moisturizers containing some aromas or food additives may trigger an immune reaction or even cause users to develop new allergies.

There is currently no regulation over use of the term "hypoallergenic", and even pediatric skin products with the label were found to still contain allergens. 

Those with eczema are especially vulnerable to an allergic reaction with lotions and creams, as their compromised skin barrier allows preservatives to bind with and activate immune cells.

The American Academy of Allergy, Asthma, and Immunology released a warning in 2014 that natural lotion containing ingredients commonly found in food (such as goats milk, cow's milk, coconut milk, or oil) may introduce new allergies, and an allergic reaction when those foods are later consumed. A paper published in 2021 by researchers at St. George’s, University of London found that frequent skin moisturization in early life might promote the development of food allergy, even when skin conditions such as eczema are taken into account.

Fire risk 

Paraffin based skincare products and contaminated clothing can pose a serious fire hazard. Between 2010 and 2018, paraffin was linked to 50 fire incidents (49 of which were fatal) in the U.K. A West Yorkshire Fire and Rescue Service study found that clothing contaminated with cream containing only 21% paraffin, when set alight, was fully engulfed in flame in 3 seconds. The Medicines and Healthcare products Regulatory Agency (MHRA) released a warning in 2008 about the flammability of paraffin-based products. MHRA recommends that sheets of people using paraffin are changed regularly, and that people refrain from smoking or bringing open flames around patients using paraffin. MHRA also recommends that skin creams containing any paraffin have a flammability warning on the packaging.

Brands of moisturizers 

Artistry
Aveeno
Bath & Body Works
CeraVe
Cetaphil
Curel
Dial
Eucerin
Gold Bond
Garnier
Jergens
Johnson & Johnson
Lux
Neutrogena
Nivea
Olay
Sebamed
Sensavor
Simple Skincare
Suave
Vaseline

See also

 Barrier cream

References 

Skin care
Emollients and protectives